The 1962 Norwegian Football Cup was the 57th season of the Norwegian annual knockout football tournament. The tournament was open for all members of NFF, except those from Northern Norway. Fredrikstad was the defending champions, but was eliminated by the second tier team Vard in the quarterfinal.

The final was played at Ullevaal Stadion in Oslo on 28 October 1962, and was contested between two second-tier teams, Gjøvik-Lyn and Vard. This was Vard's first appearance in a cup final, while it was Gjøvik-Lyn's second final, having lost the 1914 final. Gjøvik-Lyn secured their first title with a 2-0 victory against Vard, and qualified for the 1963–64 European Cup Winners' Cup.

Third round

|colspan="3" style="background-color:#97DEFF"|12 August 1962

|-
|colspan="3" style="background-color:#97DEFF"|Replay: 15 August 1962

|}

Fourth round

|colspan="3" style="background-color:#97DEFF"|2 September 1962

|-
|colspan="3" style="background-color:#97DEFF"|Replay: 5 September 1962

|-
|colspan="3" style="background-color:#97DEFF"|Replay: 6 September 1962

|}

Quarter-finals

|colspan="3" style="background-color:#97DEFF"|23 September 1962

|}

Semi-finals

|colspan="3" style="background-color:#97DEFF"|7 October 1962

|-
|colspan="3" style="background-color:#97DEFF"|Replay: 17 October 1962

|-
|colspan="3" style="background-color:#97DEFF"|2nd replay: 24 October 1962

|}

Final

See also
1961–62 Norwegian Main League
1962 in Norwegian football

References

Norwegian Football Cup seasons
Norway
Football Cup